A Beginner's Guide to Endings is a 2010 film directed by Jonathan Sobol and starring Harvey Keitel, Scott Caan, and J.K. Simmons.

Plot
Upon learning they only have a few days left to live, three brothers set off to reverse a lifetime of mistakes.

Cast
 Harvey Keitel as Duke White
 Paulo Costanzo as Jacob "Cob" White
 Scott Caan as Cal White
 J. K. Simmons as Uncle Pal
 Tricia Helfer as Miranda
 Jason Jones as "Nuts"
 Jared Keeso as Juicebox
 Siam Yu as Todd
 Gavin Fox as Rahm The Baptist
 Wendy Crewson as Goldie White
 Stephen McHattie as Fitz

Production
Filming took place in New York City in October 2009. The film released at the 2010 Toronto International Film Festival on September 17.

Filming also took place in Niagara Falls, Canada. There is a shot of the Avon Theatre in Hamilton, Ontario.

References

External links
 

2010 films
2010 comedy-drama films
American comedy-drama films
Canadian comedy-drama films
English-language Canadian films
2010s English-language films
Films shot in Ontario
Films directed by Jonathan Sobol
2010 directorial debut films
2010s American films
2010s Canadian films